"Ocean" is a song by Colombian singer-songwriter Karol G. It was written by Karol G, Carlos Morales, Jorge Valdés and Ovy On The Drums, and produced by the latter. The song was released on May 3, 2019 through Universal Music Latino, as the fifth single from her second studio album of the same name.

Background 

The song was announced hours priors with the release of the album through Karol G's social media accounts, with a snippet of the song and music video. The song was released simultaneously with the album on May 3, 2019. A remix featuring Canadian singer-songwriter Jessie Reyez was released on September 30, 2019.

Critical reception 

Thom Jurek of AllMusic stated: "Adding to the wealth of diversity to this attempt at Latin pop domination, the title track is a sumptuous, intimately wrought piano ballad."

Rolling Stone called the song "Impressively varied" in the wholesomeness of the album.

Commercial performance 

"Ocean" debuted at number 31 on the US Billboard Hot Latin Songs chart dated May 18, 2019. On it’s eighteen week, the song reached its peak of number 22 on the chart dated September 14, 2019.

The song received a double Diamond+4× Platinum+Gold certification on Mexico by AMPROFON on May 26, 2021, for sales of 870 thousand equivalent-units.

Awards and nominations

Music video 

The music video for "Ocean" was self-directed by Karol G and was released on her YouTube channel on May 3, 2019. Both Karol G and her partner at the time Anuel AA star on the music video.

Charts

Weekly charts

Year-end charts

Certifications

References

2019 singles
Karol G songs